National Route 56 is a national highway in South Korea connects Cheorwon County to Yangyang County. It established on 14 March 1981.

Main stopovers

 Gangwon Province
 Cheorwon County - Hwacheon County - Chuncheon - Hongcheon County - Yangyang County

Major intersections

 (■): Motorway
IS: Intersection, IC: Interchange

Gangwon Province

References

56
Roads in Gangwon